Mateus Mendes Ferreira Pires (born 22 January 1992), commonly known as Mateus Mendes, is a Brazilian footballer who plays as a defender for Azuriz.

Career 
In February 2016 he signed a contract with the Ukrainian Premier League FC Chornomorets.

References

External links
Profile at Zerozero

Mateus Mendes at ZeroZero

1992 births
Living people
Brazilian footballers
Brazilian expatriate footballers
Association football defenders
Associação Esportiva Velo Clube Rioclarense players
Associação Atlética Internacional (Limeira) players
Independente Futebol Clube players
FC Chornomorets Odesa players
Rio Claro Futebol Clube players
Clube Atlético Patrocinense players
Salgueiro Atlético Clube players
Moto Club de São Luís players
Clube Esportivo Lajeadense players
Grêmio Esportivo Brasil players
Campeonato Brasileiro Série C players
Ukrainian Premier League players
Expatriate footballers in Ukraine
Brazilian expatriate sportspeople in Ukraine
Azuriz Futebol Clube players